Spaniinae is a worldwide subfamily of predatory snipe flies.

Genera
Litoleptis Chillcott, 1963 - Nearctic, Oriental, Neotropic
Omphalophora Becker, 1900 -  Palearctic, Nearctic
Palaeoarthroteles Kovalev & Mostovski, 1997
Ptiolina Staeger in Zetterstedt, 1842 - Nearctic, Palearctic
Spania  Meigen, 1830 - Nearctic, Palearctic
Spaniopsis White, 1914 - Australasia
Symphoromyia Frauenfeld, 1867 - Nearctic, Palearctic

References

Rhagionidae
Brachycera subfamilies
Taxa named by Richard Karl Hjalmar Frey